The Armenia men's national under-20 basketball team is a national basketball team of Armenia, administered by the Armenian Basketball Federation. It represents the country in men's international under-20 basketball competitions. The team participated five times at the  FIBA U20 European Championship Division B.

FIBA U20 European Championship participations

See also
Armenia men's national basketball team
Armenia men's national under-18 basketball team

References

External links
Archived records of Armenia team participations

Armenia national basketball team
Men's national under-20 basketball teams
National youth sports teams of Armenia